T. J. Jackson Lears (born 1947) is an American cultural and intellectual historian with interests in comparative religious history, literature and the visual arts, folklore and folk beliefs.

Christopher Caldwell describes Lears' vision of American history in this manner: "In the great nineteenth-century narratives of the Rutgers historian T.J. Jackson Lears, the archetypal American personality is usually not a Civil War general or a cowboy or a railroad baron but a fast-talking salesman peddling Dr. Chase’s Nerve Pills or Kellogg Cereals or Dr. Warner’s Coraline Corsets."

Life
Lears was educated at the University of Virginia, the University of North Carolina, and Yale University, where he received a Ph.D. in American Studies. He has held fellowships from the Guggenheim Foundation, the Rockefeller Foundation, the American Council of Learned Societies, the National Endowment for the Humanities, the Winterthur Museum, the Smithsonian Institution, and the Shelby Cullom Davis Center at Princeton University. In October 2003 he received the Public Humanities Award from the New Jersey Council for the Humanities.

He has been a regular contributor to The New Republic, The Nation, The Los Angeles Times, The Washington Post, The New York Times, and other publications.

He has taught at Yale University, the University of Missouri, and New York University.

Lears is the Board of Governors Professor of History at Rutgers University and editor-in-chief of the Raritan Quarterly Review.

He has written essays and reviews in The New York Times, The Nation, The New York Review of Books, the London Review of Books, The New Republic, and other magazines.

Books
 No Place of Grace: Antimodernism and the Transformation of American Culture, 1880–1920 (1981). 
 Fables of Abundance: A Cultural History of Advertising in America (1994).
 Something for Nothing: Luck in America (2003). 
 Rebirth of a Nation: The Making of Modern America, 1877–1920 (2009).

Articles
 Jackson Lears, "Imperial Exceptionalism" (review of Victor Bulmer-Thomas, Empire in Retreat:  The Past, Present, and Future of the United States, Yale University Press, 2018, 459 pp.; and David C. Hendrickson, Republic in Peril:  American Empire and the Liberal Tradition, Oxford University Press, 2017, 287 pp.), The New York Review of Books, vol. LXVI, no. 2 (February 7, 2019), pp. 8-10.

References

External links
Jackson Lears, faculty page, Rutgers University
Articles by Jackson Lears in The New York Times
Articles by Jackson Lears in The Nation
Articles by Jackson Lears in The London Review of Books
Articles by Jackson Lears in The New Republic

1947 births
Living people
Rutgers University faculty
University of Virginia alumni
University of North Carolina alumni
Yale University alumni